Valde Hirvikanta  (originally von Hellens) (17 March 1863 in Turku – 2 October 1911 in Turku) was a conservative Finnish politician of the Finnish Party. He was briefly the procurator of Finland in 1905 and the president of Turku Court of Appeal in 1911. He belonged to the nobility.

Hirvikanta was shot by 24-year-old retail clerk Bruno Forsström.

References

1863 births
1911 deaths
Politicians from Turku
People from Turku and Pori Province (Grand Duchy of Finland)
19th-century Finnish nobility
Finnish Party politicians
Members of the Diet of Finland
Members of the Parliament of Finland (1909–10)
20th-century Finnish judges
Assassinated Finnish politicians
Deaths by firearm in Finland
People murdered in Finland
20th-century Finnish nobility